Zion's Church (Low Saxon: Zionskark) is a Lutheran parish church in Worpswede, Lower Saxony, Germany. The church is used and owned by the Lutheran Congregation of Worpswede within the Evangelical Lutheran State Church of Hanover. It was completed in 1759 and forms a landmark located on top of the Weyerberg hill.

Church building and furnishings 

As summus episcopus, i.e. the supreme governor of the Lutheran State Church of Hanover, he provided financial support for the construction of the church. The church was built between 1757 and 1759 during the wearisome Seven Years' War, which had its American version as the Anglo-French and Indian War.

The brick hall church is not oriented, but directed on a southwest–northeast axis. Its else rather modest interior is beautified by a typical Protestant Kanzelaltar, combining pulpit and altar table, created in Rococo forms. The pulpit altar is structured by columns and pilasters, in their midst the pulpit. It bears the Tetragrammaton יהוה in a top auriole and to the left of the pulpit the king's rocaille-ornamented initials GR (Georgius Rex, hidden on the photo by a painting of a temporary exhibition).

Lofts (or matronea) span between the outer walls and the columns of Tuscan style. The structure of the lofts and the columns carrying them show already clear classical influence. In typical classical manner the ceiling was originally completely flat, until in 1898 the central section was changed to barrel vault. Due to the loft columns connecting to the flat ceiling only the central section could be changed to barrel vault, disturbing the classical appearance of the hall, giving the impression of a three-nave structure.

There are heads of cherubim by Clara Westhoff and floral ornaments by Paula Becker at the pendentives and the columns, connecting to the ceiling. After in 1900 Westhoff and Becker, both then members of the artists' colony in Worpswede and still students, had rung the church bells for fun, which was generally understood as a fire alarm, they were fined. They could not pay and were allowed to perform instead by way of offering these decorative elements to the church.

The church tower with its spire in baroque forms had been added at the northeastern end of the actual church building only in 1798. Zion's Church is located on the Weyerberg hill, and with its tower it is a landmark, often used as subject of paintings by the artists.

The organ 
In 1763  created the first organ, which is not preserved. Deteriorating over many years, several times repaired, it went out of order in the 1890s. A new organ by the Peternell Brothers turned out too prone to repairs and was replaced in 1959. That organ by  underwent the same fate so that the presbytery of the congregation voted for a new organ in 2004. On 4 March 2012 this new organ by Hendrik Ahrend was inaugurated. Following traditions of Arp Schnitger and his disciple , Ahrend designed an instrument resembling in its disposition to Gloger's organ, the disposition of which had been recorded.

The churchyard 

The cemetery is a churchyard, thus it actually spreads around the church building. It was designed after plans of Findorff and attracts many visitors because of its elevated location on the Weyerberg and due to the graves preserved there. Among these are those of 80 known painters, authors, musicians and artisans, many of whom were members of the Worpswede Artists' Colony.

List of performers of arts and crafts buried in Worpswede 

 Ludwig Ahner; 1911–1979, sculptor and stone chiseller
 Karl Arste; 1899–1942, painter and author
 ; 1897–1979), author
 ; 1873–1953, painter
 Annemarie Bertelsmann; 1913–1997, painter
 Erna Bertelsmann, née Lundbeck; 1880-1956, sculptor and painter
 ; 1913–1942, painter
 ; 1877–1963, painter and graphic artist
 Sophie Böltjer-Mallet; 1887–1966, painter
 Willy Dammasch; 1887–1982, painter and graphic artist
 ; 1889–1981, painter and lyricist
 ; 1917–1992, photographer
 Hans am Ende; 1864–1918, painter
 ; 1915–1992, painter
 Martin Goldyga; 1894–1956, gallery owner
 ; aka Benny; 1895–1973, painter
 Herbert Jaeckel; 1904–1981, copperplate engraver
 ; 1896–1980, publisher
 ; 1915–2007, graphic artist and painter
 ; 1883–1960, author
 ; 1866–1955, painter and author
 ; 1920–1964, sculptor
 ; 1921–1995, sculptor
 ; 1892–1965, composer
 Fritz Mackensen; 1866–1953, painter
 ; 1903–1996, ceramic artist
 Willy Meyer-Osburg; 1934–2005, painter
 Leberecht Migge; 1881–1935, landscape architect, regional planner and protagonist of the life reform movement
 Paula Modersohn-Becker, 1876–1907, painter
 Walter Müller, aka Müller-Worpswede; 1901–1975, graphic artist and interior architect
 Bettina Müller-Vogeler; 1903–2001, handloom weaver and tapestry weaver
 Friedrich Netzel, aka Fritz; 1891–1945, gallery owner and art merchant
 Friedrich Netzel jun.; 1929–1994, gallery owner and art merchant
 Friedrich Netzel sen.; 1854–1931, merchant and bookbinder
 ; 1915–1986, painter and graphic artist
 Willy Ohler; 1888–1975, ceramic artist and painter
 Lisel Oppel; 1897–1960, painter
 ; 1884–1964, painter
 ; 1939–1993, illustrator
 Albert Peter Rehberg, 1895–1956, sculptor
 ; aka Tüt; 1906–1990, painter and photographer
 Eugenie Saebens, née von Garvens; 1881–1964, author
 ; 1895–1969, photographer, graphic artist and painter
 Agnes Sander-Plump; 1888–1980, painter
 ; 1875–1950, author and novelist
 ; 1883–1937, painter
 Max Karl Schwarz; 1895–1963, landscape architect
 ; 1890–1966, painter
 Lore Uphoff-Schill; 1890–1968, painter
 ; 1923–2005, philosopher and professor of Lomonosov University
 , née Schröder; 1879–1961, painter and tapestry weaver
 Martha Vogeler-Schnaars, aka Mascha; 1905–1993, weaver
 Heide Weichberger; 1922–1980, ceramic artist
 ; 1951–1998, painter, etcher and illustrator
 ; 1894–1971, painter and graphic artist
 ; 1918–2004, painter and illustrator
 ; 1889–1943, painter and sculptor
 Sergius Žurek, cabinet maker
 Charlotte Žurek-Schenk; 1910–1971, painter

Notes

External links 
 
 

Worpswede
Worpswede
Worpswede
Worpswede
Worpswede
Worpswede